Good Morning Melbourne is an Australian local morning show which aired on Network Ten in Victoria only, between 1981 until 1988. It was hosted by Roy Hampson and Annette Allison.

References

Network 10 original programming
Australian variety television shows
1981 Australian television series debuts
1988 Australian television series endings
Television shows set in Melbourne
English-language television shows